Georgios Tzelilis (born 13 January 1973) is a Greek weightlifter. He competed in the men's featherweight event at the 1996 Summer Olympics.
He was married with Mirela Manjani from 1997 to 2002.

References

1973 births
Living people
Greek male weightlifters
Olympic weightlifters of Greece
Weightlifters at the 1996 Summer Olympics
Sportspeople from Vlorë
World Weightlifting Championships medalists
21st-century Greek people
20th-century Greek people